Garnatálg is a traditional dish from the Faroe Islands. It is made by kneading intestinal fat from sheep into lumps. These get air dried in "hjallur" (outhouses where the wind can blow through) and fermented. Garnatálg is served sliced and melted, often as a sidedish for fish, particularly "ræstur fiskur" (fermented semidried fish). It can also be served over potatoes.

References

Faroese cuisine
Offal